Dryden District School No. 5, also known as Eight Square Schoolhouse, is a historic octagonal school building located in Dryden in Tompkins County, New York. It was built in 1827 and is a simple one-room, one-story, brick octagon style building constructed with a low pitch hipped roof banded by a plain narrow frieze.  A circular brick chimney rises from the center of the standing seam metal roof.  Also on the property are two free standing, wood frame, gable roofed outhouses.  It was used as a school until 1941 and is now a facility of the Dewitt Historical Society.

It was listed on the National Register of Historic Places in 1994.

References

External links
The History Center in Tompkins County

School buildings on the National Register of Historic Places in New York (state)
Octagonal buildings in the United States
School buildings completed in 1827
Museums in Tompkins County, New York
Education museums in the United States
Schools in Tompkins County, New York
Octagonal school buildings in the United States
National Register of Historic Places in Tompkins County, New York
1827 establishments in New York (state)